State Road 59 (NM 59) is a state highway in the US state of New Mexico. NM 59's eastern terminus is north of the village of Winston at NM 52, and the western terminus is at the former NM 61 by Beaverhead.

Major intersections

See also

References

059
Transportation in Catron County, New Mexico
Transportation in Sierra County, New Mexico